The Skyline film series consists of American science fiction-disaster alien action films. Based on an original story by Joshua Cordes & Liam O'Donnell, the series centers around a global alien invasion and the uprise of mankind to fight back and save humanity. The series implements various genres within each installment.

The first film was met with negative critical reception while being deemed a box office success, given its smaller production budget. Conversely, the second installment was met with a predominantly positive reception from film critics. Despite this, the film made minimal income in theaters. A third film, which mas made in part by a distribution deal with Netflix, was met with mixed reception.

Films

Skyline (2010)

Jarrod  and Elaine take a trip to Southern California for a getaway trip and to visit his friend named Terry. Their vacation quickly turns into a horrific weekend of terror, when an alien invasion follows a night of hypnotizing strange lights in the sky. What starts off as a city under attack, quickly becomes a worldwide takeover. While the city is under attack and thousands of terrified people are abducted into the ships, Jarrod and Elaine work together with their companions to survive the ensuing global genocide.

Beyond Skyline (2017)

During an alien invasion, Detective Mark Corley braves the warzone and infiltrates their ships, after his estranged son named Trent is abducted. Upon entering the spacecraft, Corley works with some unlikely allies in his rescue efforts. While aboard the ship Corley discovers that the extraterrestrials are harvesting humans for their brainpower. In his pursuits, he receives assistance from a friendly alien lifeform, who's revealed to be living embodiment of Jerrod's intelligence. As Elaine passes away giving birth to their daughter, Jerrod and Detective Corley work together to free Trent and escape the spaceship, while protecting the newborn from its otherworldly inhabitants. During the ensuing fight, Trent is overpowered and his brain is harvested to be used by one of the aliens. When the flying saucer takes a crash-landing into Southeast Asia, the team must form an alliance with a small group of survivors to take back the planet. Meanwhile, it's discovered that exposure to the DNA altering technology has left the baby Rose, who ages rapidly, with enhanced powers and abilities that may be key to defeating the planetary invaders.

Skylines (2020)

After years of working together, a virus from another planet begins to turn humans-turned-alien hybrids against their allied forces. Captain Rose Corley, who has alien-enhanced DNA and has reached adult age, forms a team to venture to the extraterrestrial home world. Together this teams works to find a cure against this unknown ailment plaguing and prevent a once all out war from once again overrunning the Earth. As they fight for survival, Rose works to outsmart the enemies with the benefit of her otherworldly knowledge, and reestablish the once forming peace.

Future

In December 2020, writer/director O'Donnell announced plans to continue the series, with intentions to bring back the featured cast. That same month, Frank Grillo expressed interest in reprise his role in the series.

Development

Film series co-writer and two-time director, Liam O'Donnell stated that the each installment intentionally explores additional science fiction genres. The filmmaker stated that various directors were influential on his work within the series, including: James Cameron, Kathryn Bigelow, George Miller, Paul Verhoeven, John Carpenter, George Lucas, Steven Spielberg, James Wan, Leigh Whannell, and Jordan Peele.

Skyline, which the filmmaker stated was limited by a smaller budget, was intended to be similar in tone to found-footage horror. Creatives involved were intent with depicting a realistic real-world alien invasion. With the extensive post-production process, the project consisted of extensive CGI special effects, where much of the budget was spent.

O'Donnell stated that with the second film, Beyond Skyline, all creatives involved were intent on making up for the areas in which the first was lacking. The filmmaker stated that he intentionally used practical effects as often as was possible to provide the alien characters with more personality and interaction with each actor. With intentions to introduce a greater level of action sequences, the premise was conceptualized as "John McClane.. in an alien invasion scenario." With fight choreography inspired by the martial arts film genre, the movie has been compared favorably to The Raid.

The third film Skylines, embraced the science fiction elements that were well-received in the previous release with O'Donnell looking to James Cameron's Aliens for referential inspiration. With each release, the filmmaker stated that his primary focus has been on character development.

Main cast and characters

Notes

Additional crew and production details

Reception

Box office and financial performance

Critical and public response

See also

 List of films featuring extraterrestrials
 List of science fiction action films

References 

American film series